Ramón Palacios Rubio (27 February 1920 – 12 February 2023) was a Spanish engineer and politician. A member of the People's Party, he served in the Senate from 1996 to 2000.

Rubio died in Madrid on 12 February 2023, at the age of 102.

References

1920 births
2023 deaths
Men centenarians
Spanish centenarians
Spanish engineers
Members of the Senate of Spain
Members of the 6th Senate of Spain
People's Alliance (Spain) politicians
People's Party (Spain) politicians
People from the Province of Jaén (Spain)